Julianus pinimus is a species of frog in the family Hylidae.
It is endemic to Brazil.
Its natural habitats are moist savanna, subtropical or tropical moist shrubland, subtropical or tropical high-altitude shrubland, subtropical or tropical dry lowland grassland, swamps, and intermittent freshwater marshes.
It is threatened by habitat loss.

References
 

Hylidae
Endemic fauna of Brazil
Amphibians described in 1973
Taxonomy articles created by Polbot
Taxobox binomials not recognized by IUCN